Kuala Klawang (Negeri Sembilan Malay: Kolo Klawang; Jawi: كوالا كلاواڠ) is a mukim and the district capital of Jelebu District, Negeri Sembilan, Malaysia.

It is connected to state capital Seremban through Malaysia Federal Route 86 Federal Route 86.

Tourist attractions
 Custom Museum
 Kuala Klawang Memorial

References

Jelebu District
Mukims of Negeri Sembilan